The Beaver River is a river in the U.S. state of Rhode Island. There are three dams along the river's length. The river is also famous locally for its trout fishing in the spring.

Course
The river rises from James Pond in Exeter. From there, it flows roughly due south through Exeter and Richmond to its mouth at the Pawcatuck River, across the Pawcatuck from Charlestown.

Crossings
Below is a list of all crossings over the Beaver River. The list starts at the headwaters and goes downstream.
Richmond
New London Turnpike
Old Mountain Road
Hillsdale Road
Kingstown Road (RI 138)
Beaver River School House Road
Shannock Hill Road

Tributaries
The Beaver River has no named tributaries, though it has many unnamed streams that also feed it.

See also
List of rivers in Rhode Island

References
Maps from the United States Geological Survey

External links
 TrailBlazersNE Beaver River Trail Profile

Rivers of Washington County, Rhode Island
Exeter, Rhode Island
Richmond, Rhode Island
Rivers of Rhode Island
Tributaries of Pawcatuck River
Wild and Scenic Rivers of the United States